Leah Lum (born May 12, 1996), also known by the Chinese name Lin Qiqi, is a Canadian ice hockey forward and member of the Chinese national ice hockey team, currently playing in the Premier Hockey Federation (PHF) with the Toronto Six.

Lum represented China in the women's ice hockey tournament at the 2022 Winter Olympics in Beijing and at the 2022 IIHF Women's World Championship Division I Group B, where she tied teammate Rachel Llanes (Lin Ni) for most goals (7) and most points (15) scored in the tournament.

Playing career 
Lum scored 102 points in 148 games with the UConn Huskies women's ice hockey program in the Hockey East (WHEA) conference of the NCAA Division I. In her last year with the Huskies, she served as alternate captain. 

After graduating, Lum signed with the Shenzhen KRS Vanke Rays of the Canadian Women's Hockey League (CWHL), who had drafted her 11th overall in the 2018 CWHL Draft. She stayed with the team as it moved to the Zhenskaya Hockey League (ZhHL) after the collapse of the CWHL in 2019 and was named to the ZhHL All-Star Game in 2020. , she ranks fourth on the Shenzhen KRS all-time record lists for most goals (28), assists (52), points (80), and games played (104).

References

External links

1996 births
Living people
Canadian expatriate ice hockey players in China
Canadian expatriate ice hockey players in Russia
Canadian expatriate ice hockey players in the United States
Canadian sportspeople of Chinese descent
Canadian women's ice hockey forwards
Ice hockey players at the 2022 Winter Olympics
Ice hockey people from British Columbia
Olympic ice hockey players of China
People from Richmond, British Columbia 
Shenzhen KRS Vanke Rays players
UConn Huskies women's ice hockey players